Mahir Shukurov  (born 12 December 1982 in Sumgayit) is a retired Azerbaijani footballer.

Career

Club
Shukurov has been regular player for Inter Baku since 2009. He has also have played for clubs like FK Karvan, Olimpik Baku, Neftchi Baku, Khazar Lankaran, as well as for the Turkish club Antalyaspor.

Anzhi Makhachkala
On 8 January 2010, following on from a successful 2010 World Cup qualification and Europa League campaign, Shukurov signed a three-year deal with FC Anzhi Makhachkala for €200,000. His debut came against Spartak Moscow, which ended in goalless draw in 2010 Russian Premier League.

Karşıyaka
In June 2014 Shukurov signed a one-year contract, with the option of a second, with PTT 1. Lig side Karşıyaka.

In February 2016, after being without a club since leaving Karşıyaka during the summer of 2015, Shukurov announced his retirement from football.

Neftchi Baku
Shukurov came out of retirement in October 2016, signing with Neftchi Baku until the end of the 2016–17 season.

International
Shukurov made his Azerbaijan debut on 8 September 2004, against Austria during 2006 FIFA World Cup qualification (UEFA). Mahir's first goal had been against Kazakhstan national football team on 6 September 2011. He scored from a penalty in the 62nd minute.

Career statistics

International

Statistics accurate as of match played 16 November 2014

International goals

References

External links
 Official website of Mahir Shukurov
 Profile on Inter Baku's Official Site
 Player profile on Affa.Az 
 

Living people
1982 births
Azerbaijani footballers
Azerbaijani expatriate footballers
Azerbaijan international footballers
AZAL PFK players
Shamakhi FK players
Association football defenders
Khazar Lankaran FK players
Antalyaspor footballers
Expatriate footballers in Russia
Expatriate footballers in Turkey
Azerbaijani expatriate sportspeople in Turkey
Azerbaijan Premier League players
Russian Premier League players
Süper Lig players
TFF First League players
FC Anzhi Makhachkala players
Gabala FC players
Karşıyaka S.K. footballers
People from Sumgait
Neftçi PFK players
FK Genclerbirliyi Sumqayit players